Sainik School Kodagu is one of the 33 Sainik Schools of India.  It is a fully residential school for boys.  The medium of instruction is English.  Established by Government of India on 18 October 2007 at Kodagu which is approximately 6 km from Kushalnagar. It is affiliated to Central Board of Secondary Education and is a member of Indian Public Schools Conference (IPSC).

The school prepares boys for entry into the National Defence Academy, Khadakwasla, Pune and for other walks of life. The school currently has around 550 students in its roll.

Administration

Campus

Admissions

N.C.C.

References

External links 
 
 Sainik Schools Society

Sainik schools
Schools in Kodagu district
Boarding schools in Karnataka
Educational institutions established in 2007
2007 establishments in Karnataka